Power Pivot, formerly known as PowerPivot (without spacing), is a feature of Microsoft Excel, a computer software spreadsheet. It is available as an add-in in Excel 2010, 2013 in separate downloads, and as an add-in included with the Excel 2016 program. Power Pivot extends a local instance of Microsoft Analysis Services tabular that is embedded directly into an Excel Workbook.  This allows a user to build a ROLAP model in Power Pivot, and use pivot tables to explore the model once it is built.  This allows Excel to act as a self-service business intelligence (BI) platform, implementing professional expression languages to query the model and calculate advanced measures.

Power Pivot primarily uses Data Analysis Expressions (DAX) as its expression language, although the model can be queried via Multidimensional Expressions (MDX) in a row set expression.  DAX expressions allow a user to create measures based on the data model, which can summarize and aggregate millions of rows of table data in seconds.  DAX expressions resolve to T-SQL queries in the Formula and Storage Engines that drive the data model, abstracting the more verbose and tedious work of writing formal queries to excel-like formula expressions.

Power Pivot uses the SSAS Vertipaq compression engine to hold the data model in memory on the client computer.  Practically, this means that Power Pivot is acting as an Analysis Services Server instance on the local workstation.  As a result, larger data models may not be compatible with the 32-bit version of Excel.

Prior to the release of Power Pivot, Microsoft relied heavily on SQL Server Analysis Services as the engine for its Business Intelligence suite. Power Pivot complements the SQL Server core business intelligence components under the vision of one Business Intelligence Semantic Model (BISM), which aims to integrate on-disk multidimensional analytics previously known as Unified Dimensional Model (UDM), with a more flexible, in-memory "tabular" model.

As a self-service business intelligence product, Power Pivot is intended to allow users with no specialized business intelligence or analytics training to develop data models and calculations, sharing them either directly or through SharePoint document libraries.

Product history and naming
Power Pivot first appeared around May 2010 as part of the SQL Server 2008 R2 product line.  It included "Power Pivot for Excel" and "Power Pivot for SharePoint"   While the product was associated with SQL Server, the add-in for Excel could be used independent of any server, and with various types of data sources.
SQL Server 2012 contained the add-in PowerPivot for Microsoft Excel 2010, this was also made available as a free download for Microsoft Excel 2010.  Sometime after that, the PowerPivot followed its own release cadence separate from SQL Server.
As part of the July 8, 2013, announcement of the new Power BI suite of self-service tools, Microsoft renamed PowerPivot as "Power Pivot" (note the spacing in the name) in order to match the naming convention of other tools in the suite.  In Excel 2013, Power Pivot is only available for certain versions of Office. In Excel 2016, it is included natively in the application in the data tab on the ribbon.

A companion feature to Power Pivot named Power Query, in Excel 2010 and 2013, was renamed to "Get & Transform" in Excel 2016. It has since been renamed back to Power Query.

See also
 Power Query, an ETL tool used with several pieces of software published by Microsoft
 Microsoft Excel
 Power BI

References

Microsoft Office